Al-Sa'adoon is a neighborhood in the Rusafa District of Baghdad, Iraq. 

Sa'adoon